Alma Bay is an island town within the locality of Arcadia on Magnetic Island in the City of Townsville, Queensland, Australia.

Geography 
The town is at the bay of the same name on the western coast of Magnetic Island.

There is a war memorial at Alma Bay Park on Armand Way commemorating military personnel who died during World War I, World War II, the Vietnam War and other conflicts.

History 
A shark-proof net was installed in Alma Bay in December 1940.

Education 
There are no schools in Alma Bay. The nearest primary school is in Nelly Bay on the island. The nearest secondary school is Townsville State High School in Railway Estate in the Townsville mainland.

Events 
An annual Anzac Day service is held at the war memorial.

References

External links 

 
 

City of Townsville
Towns in Queensland